Laon Laan station (also called Dapitan station) is a railway station located on the South Main Line in the city of Manila, Philippines.

The station is the third station from Tutuban.

The station is currently being transferred west of Laon Laan due to the construction of the NLEX Connector Road beside the westbound railtracks, with a steel platform being prepared as its temporary replacement.

Nearby landmarks
Major landmarks near the station include the Dangwa flower market, the University of Santo Tomas and SM City San Lazaro, though it requires a commute to reach those.

Philippine National Railways stations
Railway stations in Metro Manila
Railway stations opened in 1978
Buildings and structures in Sampaloc, Manila